Tulln an der Donau is a historic town in the Austrian state of Lower Austria, the administrative seat of Tulln District. Because of its abundance of parks and gardens, Tulln is often referred to as Blumenstadt ("City of Flowers"), and "The City of Togetherness" following the initiative of Peter Eisenschenk, Mayor of Tulln.

Geography
The main part of its built-up area is located on the southern bank of the Danube river.

The municipal area comprises the cadastral communities of Frauenhofen, Langenlebarn-Oberaigen, Langenlebarn-Unteraigen, Mollersdorf, Neuaigen, Nitzing, Staasdorf, Trübensee, and Tulln proper.

History
Tulln is one of the oldest towns in Austria. Although it was settled in pre-Roman times (the name Tulln is presumably of Celtic origin), it gained importance as the Roman fort of Comagena (Comagenis). In the final years of Roman rule, Saint Severinus of Noricum is said to have visited the city, saving it from the barbarians.

The town was first mentioned as Tullina in an 859 deed, when the area was part of the Bavarian marcha orientalis. It gained importance as a residence of the noble House of Babenberg, ruling as Austrian margraves from 976 onwards. Tulln lost its significance after the Babenbergs relocated their residence to Vienna.

On September 6, 1683, the Polish cavalry of King John III Sobieski united here with Imperial (Austrian) forces, as well as troops from Saxony, Bavaria and Baden for the Battle of Vienna against the invading army of the Ottoman Empire. The 20th century was another period of growth, and in 1986, Tulln applied to become capital of Lower Austria, although Sankt Pölten eventually won.

Tulln today
An important sugar producing plant, Agrana Austria, is located in Tulln. Several important trade fairs, including camping equipment and boat shows, also take place in the town. Various state institutions of Lower Austria, such as the fire brigade or the disaster relief service, have their seat in Tulln. The Federal School of Aviation is also located in Tulln.

The 37-seat town council is dominated by the Austrian People's Party, which currently holds 19 mandates. The town administration has lately carried out extensive urban traffic reform, extensively changing traffic lights with roundabouts, of which Tulln now has 22. Two bridges span the Danube in Tulln. The Franz Josef Railway crosses the Danube in Tulln, continuing via Krems an der Donau to Gmünd. Der Standard, a Viennese daily newspaper, is produced in Tulln.

Sights

 According to the Nibelungenlied, it was in Tulln that Attila the Hun saw Kriemhild (the Nibelungenlieds name for Gudrun) and proposed to her. A fountain, the Nibelungen-Brunnen ("the Nibelungen Fountain") was dedicated to this event in 2005.
 The ship Regentag by Friedensreich Hundertwasser is riding at anchor by the Danube as a part of a modern art museum here since 2004. It was first heard of in the short documentary Hundertwasser's Rainy Day (1972).
 In 2008 a shopping mall, called Rosenarcade was built.
 Aubad is a well known lake in Tulln with many visitors and tourists during spring and summer time.
 Minoritenkloster, a convent.
 A 4th-century Roman tower.

Notable citizens 
Ferdinand Grossmann (1887–1970), choral conductor, vocal teacher and composer

 Egon Schiele (1890–1918), the famous Austrian painter who was born in Tulln, and a museum (Egon-Schiele-Museum) is dedicated to him.
 Siegfried Seidl (1911–1947), convicted and hanged World War II criminal, Nazi commandant of the Theresienstadt concentration camp.
 Leo Stopfer (born 1964), painter
 Thomas Sykora (born 1968), alpine skier
 Oliver Ringelhahn (born 1969), opera singer
 Peter Balazs (born 1970), mathematician
 Alex Machacek (born 1972), jazz guitarist and composer
 Doris Schretzmayer (born 1972), actress
 Richard Koch (born 1979), jazz trumpeter
 Nina Burger (born 1987), football player
 Robert Dreissker (born 1989), professional wrestler
 Thomas Diethart (born 1992), ski jumper
 Romina Bell (born 1993), football player

References

External links 

Official homepage of Tulln
Homepage of Trübensee
Egon Schiele Museum

 
 
 

Populated places on the Danube
Cities and towns in Tulln District
Cadastral community of Tulln District